The 1975 Baltimore Colts season was the 23rd season for the team in the National Football League. Under first-year head coach Ted Marchibroda, the Colts finished the 1975 season with 10 wins and 4 losses, and tied for first in the AFC East division with the Miami Dolphins; Baltimore won the division tiebreaker, the first sweep of the Dolphins in their six years under head coach Don Shula.

The Colts won their opener, lost four straight, then swept their final nine games and narrowly edged the Dolphins for the division title. The turnaround season became forever known by Colts fans afterward as The Miracle on 33rd Street.

This was the first of three consecutive AFC East titles for the Colts. Hired in January, Marchibroda was previously the offensive coordinator for the Washington Redskins under head coach George Allen. The 1975 Colts coaching staff included 23-year-old assistant Bill Belichick, his first association with an NFL team and first coaching position.

Offseason

NFL draft

Personnel

Staff/Coaches

Final roster

Regular season

Schedule

Standings

Playoffs 

The team made it to the playoffs as a No. 3 seed and traveled to Pittsburgh to play the Steelers in the divisional round. Tied at seven at the half, Pittsburgh outscored the Colts 21–3 in the second half. The Steelers defense forced four turnovers and held the Colts to 154 total yards of offense in their 28–10 win.

Awards and honors 
Sporting News Executive of the Year: Joe Thomas
AP Coach of the Year, PFW Coach of the Year, Sporting News Coach of the Year, UPI AFC Coach of the Year: Ted Marchibroda

See also 
History of the Indianapolis Colts
Indianapolis Colts seasons
Colts–Patriots rivalry

References

Baltimore Colts
1975
AFC East championship seasons
Baltimore Colts